Manuel Cortes (born 2 May 1967) is a British trade unionist who served as the General Secretary of the Transport Salaried Staffs' Association (TSSA) between 2011 and 2022.

Early life

Cortes was born and raised in Gibraltar; while growing up, he never spoke English with his family. He left school with no qualifications.

He became an apprentice electrician, joined a local union, and gained technical qualifications from the Gibraltar and Dockyard Technical College. It allowed him to pursue further studies at a technical college in Kent. He studied Engineering at Heriot-Watt University, later becoming a full-time student representative. Later he would gain master's degrees in Optical Electronics, and also Business Economics from the University of Strathclyde. He studied Economics because he did not value the main beliefs of capitalism, which he views mostly as forms of greed.

Career
Cortes' first job after university was for the Banking, Insurance and Finance Union (BIFU) that merged with the Barclays Group Staff Union and NatWest Staff Association in 1999 to become the UNIFI , then became part of Amicus in 2004. He worked for a year as a fundraiser for Amnesty International.

Transport Salaried Staffs' Association
In March 1998, Cortes joined the TSSA, the UK's second-largest rail union, and was formerly known as the Railway Clerks' Association, a white-collar union. On 15 November 2011, he was elected General Secretary for a five-year term. In December 2016, he was re-elected with 66% of the vote on a turnout of 19%.

In 2015, Cortes endorsed Jeremy Corbyn in the Labour Party leadership election.

In 2022 Cortes was accused of sexual harassment by a former TSSA employee something which he vehemently denied and which hadn't been upheld after an investigation.

In February 2023 the report of an investigation by a Labour Party member of the House of Lords that was requested by the UK Trade Unions Council (TUC) was published. The report was critical of Cortes and other senior TSSA officials and supported the harrassment allegations made by several former TSSA staff.  Cortes and several other senior TSSA staff were dismissed following publication of the report commissioned by the TUC.

References

External links
 TSSA structure

1967 births
Alumni of Heriot-Watt University
Alumni of the University of Strathclyde
Electricians
General Secretaries of the Transport Salaried Staffs' Association
Gibraltarians
Members of the General Council of the Trades Union Congress
Living people